Mitja Valenčič, (born 1 February 1978 in Cerklje na Gorenjskem), is a Slovenian alpine skier, specialized in slalom.

Valenčič represented Slovenia at the 2006 and 2010 Winter Olympics where he was on 6th place. His best result in the Alpine skiing World Cup is the 4th place in slalom (Zagreb, 2010).

References 

1978 births
Living people
Slovenian male alpine skiers
Alpine skiers at the 2006 Winter Olympics
Alpine skiers at the 2010 Winter Olympics
Olympic alpine skiers of Slovenia
Alpine skiers at the 2014 Winter Olympics
People from the Municipality of Cerklje na Gorenjskem